The MV Karadeniz Powership Yasin Bey is Liberia-flagged floating power plant, owned and operated by Karpowership.

Cargo ship
The ship was built in 2000 as a general cargo carrier by Dalian Shipbuilding Industry Company in Dalian, Liaoning, China.

Powership
The Turkish company Karpowership purchased the general cargo ship. She was converted into a Powership at Sedef Shipyard in Tuzla, Istanbul, and renamed MV Karadeniz Powership Yasin Bey with a generation capacity of 125 MW.

On November 13, 2016, the Powership sailed to Ambon, Indonesia in a ceremony attended by the President Recep Tayyip Erdoğan, Prime Minister Binali Yıldırım, Minister of Transport, Maritime and Communication Ahmet Arslan and other officials. She was commissioned to supply electricity to the power grid on Ambon for five years.

References

2000 ships
Bulk carriers
Ships built in China
Ships of Liberia
Yasin Khan
Electric power infrastructure in Indonesia
Ships built at Sedef Shipyard